Christopher Beha is an American writer. He has written several books, and is the editor of Harper’s Magazine. His third novel, The Index of Self-Destructive Acts, was long-listed for the 2020 National Book Award in Fiction.

Works 
 The whole five feet New York : Grove Press, 2010. 
 What Happened to Sophie Wilder, 2012  
 Arts & Entertainments, 2014 
 The Index of Self-Destructive Acts, Tin House Books, 2020,

References 

Living people
21st-century American male writers
American magazine editors
Harper's Magazine people
Year of birth missing (living people)